The 2010–11 Polish Cup was the fifty-seventh season of the annual Polish football knockout tournament. It began on 21 July 2010 with the first matches of the Extra Preliminary Round and ended in 2011 with the Final. The winners qualified for the third qualifying round of the 2011–12 UEFA Europa League. Jagiellonia Białystok were the defending champions, having won their first title in the season before.

Extra Preliminary round
The draw for this round was conducted at the headquarters of the Polish FA on 29 June 2010. Participating in this round were 16 regional cup winners and 36 teams from the 2010–11 II Liga. The matches were played between 21 and 25 July 2010.

! colspan="3" style="background:cornsilk;"|21 July 2010

|-
! colspan="3" style="background:cornsilk;"|24 July 2010

|-
! colspan="3" style="background:cornsilk;"|25 July 2010

|}

Notes
Note 1: Ślęza withdrew from the competition.
Note 2: Hetman withdrew from the competition.
Note 3: The away team failed to arrive.
Note 4: Spartakus Szarowola participated under the name of Motor Lublin
Note 5: The home team failed to provide a venue.

Preliminary round
The draw for this round was conducted at the headquarters of the Polish FA on 29 June 2010. The 26 winners of the Extra Preliminary Round were drawn into 12 matches. MKS Kutno and Świt Nowy Dwór Mazowiecki received a bye to the first round. The matches took place on 4 August 2010.

! colspan="3" style="background:cornsilk;"|4 August 2010

|}

Round 1
The draw for this round was conducted at the headquarters of the Polish FA on 10 August 2010. The 14 winners of the preliminary round, along with MKS Kutno and Świt Nowy Dwór Mazowiecki and the eighteen teams from 2009–10 I Liga competed in this round.
Znicz Pruszków was drawn automatically to the second round.

! colspan="3" style="background:cornsilk;"|24 August 2010

|-
! colspan="3" style="background:cornsilk;"|25 August 2010

|}

Round 2
The draw for this round was conducted at the headquarters of the Polish FA on 31 August 2010. The 16 winners of Round 1 and the sixteen teams from 2009–10 Ekstraklasa, competed in this round. The matches were played on 21 and 22 September 2010.

! colspan="3" style="background:cornsilk;"|21 September 2010

|-
! colspan="3" style="background:cornsilk;"|22 September 2010

|}

Notes
Note 1: Played in Radomsko at Radomsko City Stadium as Concordia's Piotrków Trybunalski City Stadium is undergoing renovative work.

Round 3
The 16 winners from Round 2 competed in this round. The matches took place on October 26 and October 27, 2010.

! colspan="3" style="background:cornsilk;"|26 October 2010

|-
! colspan="3" style="background:cornsilk;"|27 October 2010

|}

Quarter-finals
The 8 winners from Round 3 will compete in this round.The matches will be played in two legs. The first legs will take place between 20 February 2011 and 2 March 2011, while the second legs will be played between 2 and 16 March 2011.

|}

First leg

Second leg

Semi-finals
The 4 winners from the Quarterfinals will compete in this round.The matches will be played in two legs. The first legs will take place on 5 and 6 April 2011, while the second legs will be played two weeks later on 19 and 20 April 2011.

|}

First leg

Second leg

Final

See also
 2010–11 Ekstraklasa

References
 90minut.pl

External links
http://www.soccer24.com/poland/polish-cup/

Polish Cup
Polish Cup seasons
Cup